Rui or RUI may refer to:

Names 
 Rui (surname) (芮), a Chinese surname
 Rui (given name), a given name

Places 
 Rui (state) (芮), a Chinese state during the Zhou Dynasty
 Rui (village), a census town in Kolhapur district, Maharashtra, India.

 Royal University of Ireland

In fiction 
 Ruy Blas, a tragic drama by Victor Hugo
 Hanazawa Rui, a character in the Japanese manga series Boys Over Flowers
 Rui, a character played by actor Luiz Fernando Guimarães in the popular Brazilian sitcom Os Normais and its spin-off films
 Rui (累), a character in the Japanese anime/manga series Demon Slayer: Kimetsu no Yaiba
 Ninomiya Rui, a character in the Japanese anime Gatchaman Crowds

Species 
 Rui fish, a more common name for Labeo rohita

Other 

 Radio Ukraine International, is a Ukrainian national worldwide radio broadcasting service , abbreviated RUI

See also 
 Ruy (disambiguation)